Workers' Party is a name used by several political parties throughout the world. The name has been used by both organisations on the left and right of the political spectrum. It is currently used by followers of Marxism, Marxism–Leninism, Maoism, social democracy, democratic socialism, socialism and Trotskyism.

Current Workers' Parties

Defunct Workers' Parties
Defunct Workers' parties include:

See also
 National Trust Party (Malaysia), formerly known as the Malaysian Workers' Party
 List of Labour parties
 Communist party (disambiguation)
 National Workers Party (disambiguation)
 Socialist Workers Party (disambiguation)
 United Workers' Party (disambiguation)
 Lists of political parties

Labour movement
Lists of political parties